The 2013 Dhivehi League(a Maldivian football association) started on 26 February 2013 and ended on 28 July 2013.

League table
Format: In Round 1 and Round 2, all eight teams play against each other. The top six teams after Round 2 play against each other in Round 3. The teams with the most total points after Round 3 are crowned the Dhivehi League champions and qualify for the AFC Cup. The top four teams qualify for the President's Cup. The bottom two teams after Round 2 play against the top two teams of the Second Division in Dhivehi League Qualification for places in the next year's Dhivehi League.

Standings of round 1

Standings of round 2

Standings of round 3

Final standing

Promotion/relegation playoff

Matches

References

External links
Football Association of Maldives

Dhivehi League seasons
Maldives
Maldives
1